Princess Alexandra of Sayn-Wittgenstein-Berleburg, Countess Ahlefeldt-Laurvig-Bille (Alexandra Rosemarie Ingrid Benedikte; born 20 November 1970), is the first daughter and second of three children of Prince Richard of Sayn-Wittgenstein-Berleburg and Princess Benedikte of Denmark.

Under the succession rules set by King Frederik IX, since Princess Benedikte and her children, including Princess Alexandra, have not taken up permanent residence in Denmark, they have effectively waived their place in the line of succession to the Danish throne. Since 19 May 1998, Alexandra has been a Danish citizen.

First marriage and children
Alexandra was married on 6 June 1998 at Gråsten Palace to Count Jefferson von Pfeil und Klein-Ellguth. Jefferson and Alexandra are distantly related, as both have descended from Leopold III, Duke of Anhalt-Dessau. The couple has two children:

 Count Friedrich Richard Oscar Jefferson von Pfeil und Klein-Ellguth (born 14 September 1999 at Rigshospitalet in Copenhagen.
 Countess Ingrid Alexandra Irma Astrid Benedikte von Pfeil und Klein-Ellguth, born 16 August 2003, at the Copenhagen University Hospital.

The family lived in Paris, where Count Jefferson was a managing director of the local branch of the bank Sal. Oppenheim and where she worked at UNESCO's World Heritage Centre.  Beginning in 2013, the couple lived in Heidesheim Castle, Germany, near Mainz.  The couple announced their intention to divorce in May 2017.

Second marriage
On 18 May 2019 she married Count Michael of Ahlefeldt-Laurvig-Bille (b. 26 February 1965) at Sankt Jørgens Kirke in Svendborgsund. He is a member of an ancient House of Ahlefeldt of German and Danish descent. They live in Egeskov Castle, ancestral home of Counts von Ahlefeldt.

Career

Princess Alexandra worked for UNESCO World Heritage Centre until 2013, in charge of preserving the cultural heritage of countries in the Middle East and South Asia.

Titles, styles and honours

Titles
 20 November 1970 – 6 June 1998: Her Highness Princess Alexandra of Sayn-Wittgenstein-Berleburg
 6 June 1998 – May 2017: Her Highness Princess Alexandra of Sayn-Wittgenstein-Berleburg, Countess of Pfeil und Klein-Ellguth
 May 2017 - 18 May 2019:  Her Highness Princess Alexandra of Sayn-Wittgenstein-Berleburg
 18 May 2019 – present: Her Highness Princess Alexandra of Sayn-Wittgenstein-Berleburg, Countess Ahlefeldt-Laurvig-Bille

Honours

National honours
 : Recipient of the Silver Anniversary Medal of Queen Margrethe II and Prince Henrik
 : Recipient of the Silver Jubilee Medal of Queen Margrethe II
 : Recipient of the 100th Anniversary Medal of the Birth of King Frederik IX
 : Recipient of the Queen Ingrid Commemorative Medal
 : Recipient of the 70th Birthday Medal of Queen Margrethe II
 : Recipient of the Ruby Jubilee Medal of Queen Margrethe II

Foreign honours
 : Recipient of the 50th Birthday Badge Medal of King Carl XVI Gustaf

Ancestry

References

1970 births
Living people
Nobility from Copenhagen
German princesses
House of Sayn-Wittgenstein
House of Ahlefeldt